Essen-Bergeborbeck station is located in the city of Essen in the German state of North Rhine-Westphalia on the Duisburg–Dortmund railway of the Cologne-Minden Railway Company. The line and station opened on 15 May 1847. It is classified by Deutsche Bahn as a category 6 station. Though it is named after nearby Bergeborbeck borough, it is located within the boundaries of Bochold, Essen.

The station is served by Regionalbahn services RB 32 (Rhein-Emscher-Bahn) and RB 35 (Emscher-Niederrhein-Bahn), providing a service every 30 minutes during the day on weekdays.

It is also served by tram lines 101 and 106 of the Essen Stadtbahn, operated at 10-minute intervals and bus route 196, operated by Ruhrbahn at 20-minute intervals.

Notes

Rhine-Ruhr S-Bahn stations
S2 (Rhine-Ruhr S-Bahn)
Bergeborbeck
Railway stations in Germany opened in 1847
1847 establishments in Prussia